Amaurobius cretaensis is a species of spider in the family Amaurobiidae, found in Crete.

References

cretaensis
Spiders of Europe
Spiders described in 1995